This list of people from Oshawa tracks those with biographies on Wikipedia.

A
 Philip Akin, actor
 Sean Avery, NHL hockey player

B
 Sherwood Bassin, general manager in the Ontario Hockey League 
 Wren Blair, hockey player, and NHL coach and General Manager
 Ed Broadbent, politician
 Arnie Brown, NHL player
 Sean Brown, NHL player
 Kat Burns, musician

C
 Antonio Carvalho, UFC fighter
 Daniel Caesar, singer-songwriter
 Lloyd Chadburn, Canadian World War II fighter pilot
 Stefan Charles, NFL player
 A. J. Cook, actress

D
Mitch de Snoo, professional lacrosse player

E
 Dennis Edmonton, songwriter Born to be Wild
 Jerry Edmonton, member of Steppenwolf
 Michael Elgin, professional wrestler
 Shirley Eikhard, songwriter Something to Talk About
 Evangeline Lydia Emsley, nurse in World War I

F
 John H. Foote, film critic
 Elijah Fisher, basketball player
 Owen Fulton, athlete

H
 John Hanson, actor and singer
 Shalom Harlow, Canadian supermodel and actress
 Dale Hawerchuk, NHL hockey player
 Sandy Hawley, horse jockey
 Harry Hess, singer in rock group Harem Scarem.
 Matthew Hughes, Olympian in the 3000m steeplechase at the 2016 Summer Olympics
 Kathryn Humphreys, sports anchor

J
 Donald Jackson, figure skater who won the bronze at the 1960 Olympics

K
 Greg Kean, actor
 Derek Keenan, former lacrosse player, and current head coach and General Manager of the Edmonton Rush of the National Lacrosse League

L
 Matt Leyden, manager of Oshawa Generals and Ontario Hockey Association president 
 Paul Lowman, musician
 Alexandra Luke, artist
 John MacLean, NHL player

M
 Kevin McClelland, NHL player
 John J. McLaughlin, son of Robert McLaughlin and inventor of Canada Dry Pale Ginger Ale
 Robert McLaughlin, founder of the McLaughlin Motor Car Company, which became a major part of General Motors Canada.
 Kate Moyer, actress
 Samantha Munro, actress

N
 James Neal, NHL hockey player for the Edmonton Oilers
 Andrew Nicholls, musician, writer, and producer

O
 John O'Regan, musician

P
 John Part, three time World Darts Champion
 Wayne Petti, musician
 Stephen Poloz, Governor of the Bank of Canada

R
 Darrin Rose, comedian
 Scott Russell, television sportscaster
 Paul Romanuk, television sportscaster

S
 Bill Siksay, politician and queer activist
 Lennon Stella, actress and musician
 Maisy Stella, actress and musician

T
 Janice Tanton, contemporary Canadian artist, and cousin to jockey Sandy Hawley (above)
 Jeff Teravainen, actor
 Shawn Thornton, NHL player
 Albert W. Tucker, mathematician

U
 Barbara Underhill, figure skater

V
 Darrell Vickers, musician, writer, and producer
 Angela Vint, actress

W
 Tom Walmsley, writer
 Tonya Lee Williams, actress
 Jonathan Wilson, actor, comedian and playwright
 Nigel Wilson, major league baseball player

Y
 Lori Yates, country singer and songwriter

Musical groups
 Cuff the Duke, indie-rock band
 Dizzy, Juno Award-winning Indie pop band.
 Lennon & Maisy, country music duo, songwriters and actresses. Star as Maddie & Daphne Conrad on the ABC musical drama series Nashville
 The Stellas, country music duo and songwriters
 Wednesday, recording artists Paul Andrew Smith, Mike O'Neil, Randy Begg, John Dufek

References

Oshawa
 
Oshawa